Leuwiliang is a town and district in the province of West Java on Java in Indonesia. Currently it lies within Bogor Regency, but is within that part of the regency that is being split off to form the new West Bogor Regency. The population according to the 2020 census was 124,670.

Gallery

References

Districts of Bogor Regency
Populated places in West Java